South Side School District (or South Side Public Schools) is a public school district based in Bee Branch, Arkansas, United States. The South Side School District provides early childhood, elementary and secondary education for more than 500 prekindergarten through grade 12 students at its two facilities within Van Buren County, Arkansas. The district is accredited by the Arkansas Department of Education (ADE). It also includes sections of Faulkner County.

It includes Bee Branch, as well as all of Damascus. Additionally Guy and Twin Groves physically extend into the district.

Schools 
 South Side High School, serving approximately 200 students in grades 7 through 12.
 South Side Elementary School, serving more than 300 students in kindergarten through grade 6.

References 

School districts in Arkansas
Education in Van Buren County, Arkansas